Dama is one of the woredas in the Oromia Region of Ethiopia. It is part of the Guji Zone. It was previously part of Uraga woreda.

Demographics 
The 2007 national census reported a total population for this woreda of 56,896, of whom 28,152 were men and 28,744 were women; 1,439 or 2.53% of its population were urban dwellers. The majority of the inhabitants said they were Protestant, with 67.85% of the population reporting they observed this belief, while 14.78% of the population practiced traditional beliefs, and 5.91% practised Ethiopian Orthodox Christianity.

Notes 

Districts of Oromia Region